Havelock City is a large mixed-use real-estate project in Colombo, Sri Lanka. The Residential component of the project consists of 8 residential towers and the Commercial component of the project consists of a 46-storey office tower and a Shopping Mall built to international standards. It is popular for its clubhouse, 7-acre garden,  and the overall size of the project. The first 4 residential towers, namely Park Tower and Elibank Tower (of construction Phase-1), and Layards Tower and Davidson Tower (of construction Phase-2), were completed as at early 2017 with 22 floors each, and is currently occupied by residents. Phase-3 is currently under construction, and will consist of the Stratford Tower and Melford Tower, with 28 floors each. Piling for Phase-4 was done with Phase-3 to expedite development. Both phases is estimated to cost over US$130 million.

The ground-breaking ceremony for the commercial component was ceremonially conducted on 29 December 2016 with the auspices of S P Tao, the chairman of Overseas Realty, along with other dignitaries such as ministers Mangala Samaraweera and Champika Ranawaka.

Construction 

East China Architecture Design and Research Institute (ECADI) and Design Group Five International of Sri Lanka are the leading architects of the project.

Prior to construction commencing, the land was the largest cleared land in Colombo.

Bridge 
The Havelock City Bridge is a  beam bridge which connects the Havelock City premises at the southeast of the bridge, to Skelton Road in the northwest. The bridge's ground-breaking ceremony was held 4 September 2008, and completed in late 2012. The bridge was constructed by the Sri Lankan engineering firm International Construction Consortium at a cost of US$1.27 million.

See also 

List of tallest structures in Sri Lanka

References

External links 
 

Buildings and structures under construction in Sri Lanka
Residential skyscrapers
Buildings and structures in Colombo
Residential skyscrapers in Sri Lanka
Apartment buildings in Colombo